Stansfield Mill is a Grade II listed tower mill at Stansfield, Suffolk, England which is derelict.

History
Stansfield Mill was built in 1840, replacing an earlier post mill. The millwright who built the mill is probably William Bear of Sudbury. It is not recorded when the mill ceased work, but the cap was removed in 1922 and the mill subsequently became derelict.

Description

Stansfield Mill is a five-storey tower mill. It had a dome shaped cap winded by a fantail. There were four Patent sails. The machinery is of wood, including the clasp arm great spur wheel. The mill drove two pairs of millstones.

References

External links
Windmill World webpage on Stansfield Mill.

Windmills in Suffolk
Tower mills in the United Kingdom
Windmills completed in 1840
Towers completed in 1840
Grinding mills in the United Kingdom
Grade II listed buildings in Suffolk
Grade II listed windmills
Borough of St Edmundsbury